Jung-hyun, also spelled Jeong-hyeon, is a Korean unisex given name. Its meaning differs based on the hanja used to write each syllable of the name. There are 75 hanja with the reading "jung" and 25 hanja with the reading "hyun" on the South Korean government's official list of hanja which may be registered for use in given names. People with this name include:

Entertainers
Yoo Jung-hyun (born 1967), South Korean male television personality and politician
Kim Jung-hyun (actor, born 1976), South Korean male actor
Lena Park (Korean name Park Jung-hyun; born 1976), American female R&B singer of Korean descent
Lee Jung-hyun (born 1980), South Korean female singer
Lim Jeong-hyun (born 1983), South Korean male guitarist
Kim Jung-hyun (actor, born 1990), South Korean male actor 
Xiyeon (born Park Jung-hyun, 2000), South Korean female singer, member of Pristin

Footballers
Cho Jung-hyun (born 1969), South Korean male forward (K-League Classic)
Song Jung-hyun (born 1976), South Korean male midfielder (China League One)
Wang Jung-hyun (born 1976), South Korean male defender (China League One)
Chu Jung-hyun (born 1988), South Korean male midfielder (Korea National League)
Kim Jeong-hyun (footballer, born 1988), South Korean male forward (K-League Classic)
Kim Jung-hyun (footballer, born 1990), South Korean male midfielder (J2 League)
Son Jeong-hyeon (born 1991), South Korean male goalkeeper (K-League Challenge)
Kim Jeong-hyun (footballer, born 1993), South Korean midfielder (K-League Classic)

Other
Nam Jung-hyun (born 1933), South Korean male writer
Mun Jeong-hyeon (born ), South Korean Catholic priest and democracy activist
Lee Jung-hyun (politician) (born 1958), South Korean male politician (Saenuri Party)
Lee Jung-hyun (basketball) (born 1987), South Korean male basketball player
Yim Jung-hyun (born 1987), South Korean male racewalker

See also
List of Korean given names
Shin Jung-hyeon (born 1938), South Korean male rock guitarist
Gwon Jung-hyeon (born 1942), South Korean male cyclist
Jung Hyun (born 1994), South Korean baseball player
Chung Hyeon (born 1996), South Korean tennis player

References

Korean unisex given names